The Tête de Ran (1,422 m) is a mountain of the Jura, located south-west of the Vue des Alpes in the canton of Neuchâtel.

The summit is easily accessible with a road culminating at 1,329 metres. Several surface ski-lifts are located on the southern slopes, but are no longer in operation as of 2021.

References

External links
Tête de Ran on Hikr

Mountains of the Jura
Mountains of the canton of Neuchâtel
Mountains of Switzerland
One-thousanders of Switzerland